Lady Lake is a lake located on Vancouver Island on Forbidden Plateau, an expansion of Browns River.

References

Alberni Valley
Lakes of Vancouver Island
Lakes of British Columbia